Netro is a comune (municipality) in the Province of Biella in the Italian region Piedmont, located about  northeast of Turin and about  northeast of Biella.

The municipality of Netro contains the frazioni (subdivisions, mainly villages and hamlets) Castellazzo and Colla di Netro.

Netro borders the following municipalities: Donato, Graglia, Mongrando.

Demographic evolution

References

Cities and towns in Piedmont